Nanda Kyaw Swa was the Deputy Speaker of the Pyithu Hluttaw, the lower house of Burma's parliament, the Pyidaungsu Hluttaw. He was elected to the post from 31 January 2011 to 29 January 2016. He was also chair of the Rights Committee in the Lower House (2011–16). His father Tin Pe, is a retired Brigadier General.

References

Members of Pyithu Hluttaw
People from Yangon
1951 births
Living people